Yazd County is in Yazd province, Iran. The capital of the county is the city of Yazd. At the 2006 census, the county's population was 515,044 in 138,108 households. The following census in 2011 counted 582,682 people in 168,458 households. At the 2016 census, the county's population was 656,474 in 195,134 households.

Administrative divisions

The population history of Yazd County's administrative divisions over three consecutive censuses is shown in the following table. The latest census shows two districts, four rural districts, and four cities.

References

 

Counties of Yazd Province